Justyna Jegiołka (born 17 September 1991) is a retired Polish tennis player.

She won two singles and 16 doubles titles on the ITF Circuit in her career. On 6 October 2014, she reached her best singles ranking of world No. 298. On 18 April 2016, she peaked at No. 191 in the doubles rankings.

Jegiołka made her WTA Tour debut at the 2013 Qatar Open partnering Veronika Kapshay in doubles; they lost in the first round to Shuko Aoyama and Megan Moulton-Levy.

ITF Circuit finals

Singles: 7 (2–5)

Doubles: 35 (16–19)

References
 
 

1991 births
Living people
Sportspeople from Opole
Polish female tennis players
20th-century Polish women
21st-century Polish women